Elections were held in the  Zamboanga Peninsula for seats in the House of Representatives of the Philippines on May 10, 2010.

The candidate with the most votes won that district's seat for the 15th Congress of the Philippines.

Note that in Isabela, Basilan, although a part of this region, the voters elect their representative via Basilan's legislative district. Isabela is politically within Basilan despite being on separate regions.

Summary

Zamboanga City

1st District
Maria Isabelle Climaco Salazar is the incumbent.

2nd District
Erico Basilio Fabian is the incumbent.

Zamboanga del Norte

1st District
Cecilia Jalosjos-Carreon is retiring; her nephew provincial board member Seth Frederick Jalosjos is her party's nominee for the district's seat.

2nd District
Rosendo Labadlabad is the incumbent.

3rd District
Cesar Jalosjos is the incumbent.

Zamboanga del Sur

1st District
Victor Yu is the incumbent.

2nd District
Incumbent Antonio Cerilles will run for governor of Zamboanga del Sur. His wife three-term governor Aurora Enerio-Cerilles is his party's nominee for the district's seat.

Zamboanga Sibugay

1st District
Incumbent Belma Cabilao is in third consecutive term already and is ineligible for reelection. His son, Jonathan Yambao runs under her party.

2nd District
Incumbent Dulce Ann Hofer will run for governor of Zamboanga Sibugay. Provincial administrator George Hofer II is her party's nominee for the district's seat.

External links
Official website of the Commission on Elections

2010 Philippine general election
2010